The men's shot put event was part of the track and field athletics programme at the 1948 Summer Olympics. Twenty-four athletes from 15 nations competed. The maximum number of athletes per nation had been set at 3 since the 1930 Olympic Congress. The competition was held on 3 August. The final was won by American Wilbur Thompson. Thompson's compatriots, Jim Delaney and Jim Fuchs took 2nd and 3rd place. It was the ninth time that an American had won the event, and the fifth time that the Americans had swept the medals.

Background

This was the 11th appearance of the event, which is one of 12 athletics events to have been held at every Summer Olympics. None of the finalists from the pre-war 1936 Games returned. The American team was strong; Charles Fonville, who had been the "best putter early in the year" and had set the world record in April, was unable to even make the three-man roster. Jim Delaney won the U.S. trials, with Wilbur Thompson the runner-up.

Canada, Iceland, Pakistan, and Peru each made their debut in the men's shot put. The United States appeared for the 11th time, the only nation to have competed in all Olympic shot put competitions to date.

Competition format

The competition used the two-round format introduced in 1936, with the qualifying round completely separate from the divided final. In qualifying, each athlete received three attempts; those recording a mark of at least 14.60 metres advanced to the final. If fewer than 12 athletes achieved that distance, the top 12 would advance. The results of the qualifying round were then ignored. Finalists received three throws each, with the top six competitors receiving an additional three attempts. The best distance among those six throws counted.

Records

Prior to the competition, the existing world and Olympic records were as follows.

Jim Fuchs broke the Olympic record with his first throw of the final, at 16.32 metres. Wilbur Thompson, later in the round, threw 16.47 metres to break the new record. In the second throw of the final, Jim Delaney achieved a new record at 16.68 metres. Thompson again broke this new record, putting the shot 17.12 metres. That would hold as the record through the rest of the competition. In all, the three men had 10 throws greater than the old Olympic record: all five of Thompson's legal throws, three of Fuchs's throws, and two of Delaney's.

Schedule

All times are British Summer Time (UTC+1)

Results

Qualifying round

Qual. rule: qualification standard 14.60m (Q) or at least best 12 qualified (q).

Final

References

External links
Organising Committee for the XIV Olympiad, The (1948). The Official Report of the Organising Committee for the XIV Olympiad. LA84 Foundation. Retrieved 5 September 2016.

Athletics at the 1948 Summer Olympics
Shot put at the Olympics
Men's events at the 1948 Summer Olympics